Alfred Serreqi (born September 24, 1938) was the minister for foreign affairs for Albania in the 1992 government of Sali Berisha. He is a member of the Democratic Party.

References 

Living people
Democratic Party of Albania politicians
Government ministers of Albania
Foreign ministers of Albania
1938 births